In computational complexity theory, DLOGTIME is the complexity class of all computational problems solvable in a logarithmic amount of computation time on a deterministic Turing machine. It must be defined on a random-access Turing machine, since otherwise the input tape is longer than the range of cells that can be accessed by the machine. It is a very weak model of time complexity: no random-access Turing machine with a smaller deterministic time bound can access the whole input.

Examples

DLOGTIME includes problems relating to verifying the length of the input, for example the problem "Is the input of even length?", which can be solved in logarithmic time using binary search.

Applications

DLOGTIME-uniformity is important in circuit complexity.

References

Complexity classes